A chamber pot is a portable toilet, meant for nocturnal use in the bedroom. It was common in many cultures before the advent of indoor plumbing and flushing toilets.

Names and etymology
"Chamber" is an older term for bedroom. It was also known as a chamber utensil or bedroom ware.

History

The introduction of indoor flush toilets started to displace chamber pots in the 19th century, but they remained common until the mid-20th century. The alternative to using the chamber pot was a trip to the outhouse.

In China, the chamber pot (便壶 (biàn hú) was common. A wealthy salt merchant in the city of Yangzhou became the symbol of conspicuous excess when he commissioned a chamber pot made of gold which was so tall that he had to climb a ladder to use it.

Modern use

Chamber pots continue in use  in areas lacking indoor plumbing.

In the Philippines, chamber pots are used as urinals and are known as arinola in most Philippine languages, such as Cebuano and Tagalog.

In Korea, chamber pots are referred to as yogang (요강).  They were used by people who did not have indoor plumbing to avoid the cold elements during the winter months.

Children's potties

The term "potty" is used when discussing the toilet with small children, such as during potty training. It is also usually used to refer to the small, toilet-shaped devices made especially for potty training, which are similar to chamber pots. These "potties" are generally a large plastic bowl with an ergonomically-designed back and front to protect against splashes. They may have a built-in handle or grasp at the back to allow easy emptying and a non-slip bottom to prevent the child from sliding while in use. Some are given bright colors, and others may feature gentle or unoffensive drawings or cartoon characters. In many cases they are used since it is difficult for children to maneuver themselves up onto the normal toilet; in addition the larger opening in the regular toilet is much too wide for a child to sit over comfortably and not fall in without some type of aid. Their size means they can be packed away in a bag for days out or when camping with young children, and can be placed near or under beds for sufferers of nocturia or some other form of incontinence.

Shapes and related items
A chamber pot might be disguised in a sort of chair (a close stool). It might be stored in a cabinet with doors to hide it; this sort of nightstand was known as a commode, hence the latter word came to mean "toilet" as well. For homes without these items of furniture, the chamber pot was stored under the bed.

The modern commode toilet and bedpan, used by bedbound or disabled persons, are variants of the chamber pot.

Cultural references
"The Crabfish" is a 17th century folk song about what is most likely a common lobster, stored in a chamber pot by an unwise fisherman. The moral of the song is that one should look into a chamberpot before using it.

Philippine mythology recounts that giving newlyweds a chamberpot assures them of prosperity.  President Elpidio Quirino, as part of a smear campaign against him, was falsely rumoured to possess a golden arinola.

Thomas More in his satire Utopia had chamberpots made out of gold.

See also

History of water supply and sanitation

References

Toilets